Isaiah Charles Austin (born October 25, 1993) is an American former professional basketball player. He played two years of college basketball for Baylor University and was set to enter the NBA in 2014 until he was diagnosed with a mild form of Marfan syndrome. In 2016, he was cleared to continue playing basketball after a two-year stint away from the game. Between 2017 and 2021, he played professionally overseas.

High school career
Austin attended Grace Preparatory Academy in Arlington, Texas. As a senior in 2011–12, he averaged 15 points, 11 rebounds and five blocks per game, earning back-to-back Fort Worth Star-Telegram Super Team Player of the Year honors. Austin participated in the 2012 McDonald's All-American Game, 2012 Adidas Nations and the 2012 Jordan Brand Classic. He was named to the ESPNHS All-American Elite second team and was the nation's no. 3 recruit according to ESPN.

College career
As a freshman at Baylor in 2012–13, Austin earned third-team All-Big 12 and Big 12 All-Rookie Team honors. On April 4, 2013, he recorded 15 points, nine rebounds, five blocks, four assists and two steals in the NIT championship game in which Baylor defeated Iowa 74–54. In 35 games (all starts), he averaged 13.0 points, 8.3 rebounds, 1.1 assists and 1.7 blocks in 29.9 minutes per game.

In April 2013, Austin declared for the 2013 NBA draft, but later returned to Baylor due to a shoulder injury.

As a sophomore in 2013–14, Austin earned Big 12 All-Defensive Team honors. In 38 games, he averaged 11.2 points, 5.5 rebounds, 1.4 assists and 3.1 blocks in 28.0 minutes per game.

On April 22, 2014, Austin declared for the 2014 NBA draft, forgoing his final two years of college eligibility.

Professional career

Marfan syndrome diagnosis
On June 22, 2014, Austin learned that he had been diagnosed with a mild case of Marfan syndrome, a genetic disorder that affects the body's connective tissue, which caused NBA teams to reassess selecting him. In response, NBA commissioner Adam Silver invited Austin to attend the draft as his guest. Shortly after Austin's diagnosis was made public, his agent revealed that Austin had taken out an insurance policy against career-ending disability through a special NCAA program, which was worth at least $1 million. The policy would not have paid out if Austin's career ended due to his eyesight or his shoulder, but was expected to pay out due to his Marfan diagnosis.

On June 26, 2014, between the 15th and 16th picks of the 2014 NBA draft, NBA Commissioner Adam Silver made Austin a ceremonial pick, which fulfilled his dream of getting drafted. The crowd gave him a standing ovation as he walked up to the podium. He was offered a job in the NBA by Adam Silver, with the stipulation that he finish his degree at Baylor University.

Return to basketball
On November 30, 2016, Austin was medically cleared to play basketball and began considering offers from overseas. On January 7, 2017, he signed his first professional contract with Serbian club FMP. He made his debut for FMP on January 15, 2017, recording nine points and four rebounds in a 92–85 win over Mornar Bar. In 12 KLS games, he averaged 7.6 points and 3.9 rebounds per game. He also averaged 9.1 points, 3.2 rebounds and 1.2 blocks in nine Adriatic League games.

In July 2017, Austin joined Guangzhi Weizhuang of the Chinese NBL. In 16 games for Guangxi, he averaged 34.6 points, 13.4 rebounds, 2.8 assists, 1.1 steals and 4.3 blocks per game.

On November 11, 2017, Austin signed with the Yulon Luxgen Dinos of the Super Basketball League. He appeared in three games for Yulon before leaving the team in mid-December.

On January 20, 2018, Austin signed with Champville of the Lebanese Basketball League. He appeared in four games for Champville before leaving the team in February.

In June 2018, Austin re-joined Guangxi Rhino of the Chinese NBL. In 32 games, he averaged 33.2 points, 10.4 rebounds, 2.6 assists and 1.7 blocks per game.

On October 16, 2018, Austin signed with Nanjing Monkey King of the Chinese Basketball Association. In 34 games, he averaged 17.0 points, 8.5 rebounds and 2.1 blocks per game.

On August 18, 2019, Austin signed with Beirut Club of the Lebanese Basketball League. He appeared in four games for Beirut in October 2019.

In December 2019, Austin joined Mets de Guaynabo for their return to the Baloncesto Superior Nacional in 2020. As an expansion team, the Mets were allowed to sign three "import players," or players not native to Puerto Rico. In four games, he averaged 16.0 points, 8.0 rebounds, 1.8 assists and 1.5 blocks per game. On September 30, 2020, Austin signed with Panteras de Aguascalientes of the Mexican Liga Nacional de Baloncesto Profesional.

In December 2020, Austin joined Al Naser Dubai. He then had a five-game stint in the Dominican Republic with San Carlos in May 2021.

On August 29, 2021, Austin signed with Indios de Mayagüez of the Baloncesto Superior Nacional.

BIG3 career
On June 15, 2021, Austin was selected with the 1st overall pick by Enemies in the 2021 BIG3 draft.

National team career
In September 2017, the Samahang Basketbol ng Pilipinas began the process of including Austin in their men's national basketball team, to be considered as a naturalized player in the future. He suited up as an import for Chooks-to-Go Pilipinas, the national team competing as a club, at the 2017 FIBA Asia Champions Cup. They finished the tournament in fifth place, with Austin recording 37 points, 15 rebounds, six assists and six blocks in their final game of the tournament.

Post-playing career
In September 2021, Austin retired from playing professionally and joined the NBA's front office for the 2021–22 season.

Career statistics

Adriatic League

FIBA Asia Champions Cup

Personal life
Austin is partially blind in his right eye from a spontaneous retinal detachment that occurred during middle school. He had kept the visual loss a secret, known only to his teammates and close friends until January 17, 2014.

On December 16, 2014, Austin was put into 2K Sports' NBA 2K15 as a free agent.

Austin is the nephew of nine-year NBA veteran Isaac Austin.

References

External links
 Baylor Bears bio
 Isaiah Austin at draftexpress.com
 Isaiah Austin at espn.com
 
 

1993 births
Living people
American disabled sportspeople
American expatriate basketball people in China
American expatriate basketball people in Lebanon
American expatriate basketball people in Mexico
American expatriate basketball people in Serbia
American expatriate basketball people in Taiwan
American men's basketball players
Basketball players from California
Baylor Bears men's basketball players
Big3 players
Beirut Club players
Centers (basketball)
McDonald's High School All-Americans
Panteras de Aguascalientes players
People with Marfan syndrome
KK FMP players
Sportspeople from Fresno, California
Sportspeople with a vision impairment
American men's 3x3 basketball players
Yulon Luxgen Dinos players
Super Basketball League imports